Lily Sullivan (born 8 September 1994) is an Australian actress, known for her role as Coral in the 2012 film Mental and in the lead role of Miranda in the 2018 TV series Picnic At Hanging Rock.

Early life and education 
Sullivan's  father is an importer of medical equipment, and her mother a visual artist, who emigrated to Australia from the UK together before Lily's birth. She grew up in Queensland and attended John Paul College in early years then went to Calvary Christian College in year 2 in Logan City,  graduating in 2011.

After seeing a production of A Streetcar Named Desire on stage in Brisbane as a teenager, Sullivan became enamoured with the idea of acting, and planned to audition for one of the major drama schools. However, a callout for a film role came in her final year of high school, and she auditioned and won the role.

Career
Sullivan made her feature film debut in P. J. Hogan's 2012 feature Mental, for which she auditioned while still at school, playing opposite Toni Collette, Liev Schreiber and Anthony LaPaglia. For this she earned an AACTA Award nomination for Best Young Actor and a Film Critics Circle of Australia Award nomination for Best Performance by a Young Actor.

In 2014, she appeared in the feature film Galore (2014), which premiered at the Melbourne International Film Festival. She earned a Best Actress award for her performance at the 2014 Cinema des Antipodes Saint-Tropez. She moved to Melbourne after this.

Sullivan was one of two runners-up in the 2015 Heath Ledger Scholarship, along with Emilie Cocquerel. Both were given round trips to Los Angeles to increase their profiles in the US market, as well as a scholarship to attend masterclasses at Screenwise Film and Television School in Sydney.

She appeared in the second season of the television series Rake (2012) and had a recurring role in the NBC series Camp (2013), an American show filmed in Queensland. She had a role in the 2015 film Sucker, starring Timothy Spall.

In 2018, she reached further prominence in the lead role of Miranda in Picnic At Hanging Rock. Later that year, she became the face of Australian pearl company Paspaley, starring in a 60-second advertising video shot on the Kimberley coast in Western Australia.

Sullivan played Lucy in the Australian film I Met A Girl, which was released on Netflix in April 2021.

In 2021, Sullivan was cast in the film Evil Dead Rise, written and directed by Lee Cronin and due for release on 21 April 2023.

In 2022 she was cast in Monolith, a science fiction thriller film made by a team of emerging South Australian filmmakers: writer Lucy Campbell, director Matt Vesely and producer Bettina Hamilton. Filmed in the Adelaide hills, the film has its world premiere at the Adelaide Film Festival on 27 October 2022.

Other work
Sullivan has also worked as a model in Australia and elsewhere.

In October 2018 Paspaley, an Australian pearling company, launched its new ad campaign entitled "Something Real", featuring Sullivan.

Filmography

Awards and nominations
 2013: Nominee, AACTA Award for Best Young Actor, for Mental
 2013: Nominee, Film Critics Circle of Australia Award for Best Performance by a Young Actor, for Mental
 2013: Nominee, Equity Ensemble Awards, Outstanding Performance by an Ensemble in a Mini-series or Telemovie (with other cast members), for Picnic at Hanging Rock
2014: Co-winner, Best Actress, Cinema des Antipodes Saint-Tropez, for Galore (with Ashleigh Cummings)

References

External links

Australian film actresses
Living people
People from Queensland
21st-century Australian actresses
Australian people of British descent
Australian television actresses
Year of birth missing (living people)